John Murray Allan  (born 20 August 1948) is a British businessman. He previously served as president and vice president of the Confederation of British Industry, and is the current chair of the supermarket chain Tesco and the housebuilder Barratt Developments.

Early life
John Murray Allan was born on 20 August 1948. Allan attended St Andrew’s High School in Kirkcaldy, and studied mathematics at University of Edinburgh.

Career
Allan's experience spans retail, logistics and housebuilding. He was chief executive of Exel, chief financial officer of Deutsche Post, deputy chairman of retailer Dixons Carphone and a non-executive director at Royal Mail. He was also previously chairman of Samsonite and he has been a non-executive director at National Grid, PHS Group and Hamleys. Allan was noted as an instrumental figure in the £3.7bn merger of Dixons and Carphone Warehouse.

In February 2011, Home Secretary Theresa May announced that Allan would join the Home Office as a non-executive member of its supervisory board in an attempt to bring business experience into the government department. 
 
Allan was elected as president of the CBI on 19 June 2018, and was elected for a second term at the 18 June 2019 annual general meeting of members. Allan was succeeded by Lord Karan Bilimoria as president of the organisation on 16 June 2020, and served as vice president from then until stepping down from the board on 21 October 2021.

Allan took over as chair of Tesco from Sir Richard Broadbent in March 2015. In December 2022, Tesco announced that Allan would step down as chairman of the board in 2024 after serving a full nine year term under UK corprorate law. He is also chairman of the housebuilder Barratt Developments.

References 

1948 births
Living people
20th-century English businesspeople
21st-century English businesspeople
Chairmen of Tesco
Commanders of the Order of the British Empire
English businesspeople in retailing
Tesco people
Alumni of the University of Edinburgh College of Science and Engineering
Barratt Developments people